South Korean girl group Itzy have released one studio album, one compilation album, six extended plays, and two single albums. On February 12, 2019, the group released their debut single album, It'z Different, led by the single "Dalla Dalla", which peaked at number two on the Circle Digital Chart and was the best-performing girl group song of 2019 in South Korea. They scored one of the biggest Billboard debuts for a new K-pop act in years, with "Dalla Dalla" peaking at number two on the World Digital Song Sales chart. In November 2019, the song surpassed 100 million streams and earned Itzy their first Platinum certification from the Korea Music Content Association (KMCA)—it was the first debut song by a K-pop group to earn a platinum certification since the introduction of certifications in April 2018. Itzy's first extended play, It'z Icy, was released on July 29, and peaked at number three on the Circle Album Chart in South Korea, while its lead single "Icy" peaked at number ten on the Circle Digital Chart.

Itzy released their second EP, It'z Me, which contained the lead single "Wannabe", on March 9, 2020. The EP debuted at number one on the Circle Album Chart, making it the group's first number-one album in the country, and at number five on the Billboard World Albums chart. "Wannabe" peaked at number six on the Circle Digital Chart, becoming Itzy's third top-ten single. On August 17, the group released their third EP, Not Shy, featuring the lead single of the same name. The EP debuted at number one on the Gaon Album Chart, marking the group's second release to top the chart, while its lead single peaked at number nine on the Gaon Digital Chart. Both "Wannabe" and "Not Shy" were certified gold by the Recording Industry Association of Japan (RIAJ) for surpassing 50 million streams in Japan. On January 22, 2021, Itzy released an English version of their EP Not Shy, with English versions of "Dalla Dalla", "Icy", "Wannabe" and "Not Shy".

On April 30, 2021, Itzy released their fourth EP Guess Who and its lead single "In the Morning". The EP debuted at number two on the Circle Album Chart and was certified Platinum in May by the Korea Music Content Association (KMCA) for surpassing 250,000 units sold, their first album to receive a certification. It also charted on the US Billboard 200 at number 148, marking the group's first appearance on the album ranking. "In the Morning" peaked at number ten on the Circle Digital Chart, marking Itzy's fifth top-ten single in the country. An English version of the song was released in May. The group's first studio album, Crazy in Love, was released on September 24, with "Loco" as its lead single. The album became Itzy's third number-one album on the Circle Album Chart and was their first to be certified 2× Platinum by the Korea Music Content Association for achieving 500,000 units sold. It also debuted at number 11 on the US Billboard 200 as Itzy's second and highest-charting entry on the chart.

Itzy's fifth EP Checkmate was released on July 15, 2022. It debuted at number one on the Circle Album Chart and was certified Million by the Korea Music Content Association (KMCA) for surpassing 1,000,000 copies sold, the group's first million-seller album. It also debuted at number eight on the Billboard 200 to become Itzy's first top-ten album in the United States. The EP's lead single "Sneakers" peaked at number five on the Circle Digital Chart and was the group's second top-five single domestically. Itzy released two Japanese singles "Voltage" and "Blah Blah Blah" which both peaked at number three on the Oricon Singles Chart. The group's sixth EP Cheshire was released on November 30, 2022 and became their fifth number-one album on the Circle Album Chart and their second album to be certified Million.

Albums

Studio albums

Compilation albums

Compilation extended plays

Extended plays

Single albums

Singles

Promotional singles

Other charted songs

Music videos

Footnotes

References

Discography
Discographies of South Korean artists
K-pop music group discographies